Billy Beck (born Frank Billerbeck; May 26, 1920 – June 29, 2011) was an American clown and character actor.

Career
Beck began his career as a clown at the legendary Cirque Medrano in Paris, France, in the late 1950s, and appeared in small roles beginning in the 1950s, Beck appeared in the 1954 made for television series Sherlock Holmes, starring Ronald Howard.

On TV he portrayed Coco the Clown in episode #24, "The Night Train Mystery", as well as appearing as Rafe in the third season of Combat! in the episode "The Town That Went Away " (1964) as Rafe and in S11E22's “The Wishbone” as Mr. Tonkins in the TV Western Gunsmoke (1966).

He also appeared in such films as Irma la Douce (1963), The Patsy (1964), The Fortune Cookie (1966), Nickelodeon (1976), House (1986), and the 1988 remake The Blob as the first victim of the title creature.

Death
Beck died in his Glendale home of natural causes on June 29, 2011, at age 91.

Filmography

References

External links

1920 births
2011 deaths
Male actors from Philadelphia
American male film actors
American male television actors
20th-century American male actors